The Engineer Basic Officer Leader Course (EBOLC), formerly known as the Engineer Officer Basic Course (EOBC), is a training course for new commissioned officers selected for the United States Army Corps of Engineers. It is run at the U.S. Army Engineer School in Fort Leonard Wood, Missouri, United States and lasts nineteen weeks and four days.

Once a United States Army officer has been commissioned and selected for the Corps of Engineers, they are sent to EBOLC to learn combat engineering, general engineering, and geospatial engineering.  With few exceptions, attendees will be the rank of Second Lieutenant who have recently commissioned. While attending, the officer will become a part of B Company, 554th Engineer Battalion, 1st Engineer Brigade receiving instruction from the U.S. Army Maneuver Support Center of Excellence (MSCoE).

At EBOLC, students spend the first 4 weeks conducting basic tactics, field craft, close quarters combat, and marksmanship. It is followed by a defensive module, an offensive module, a general engineering module, and a stability module. During the general engineering module, officers learn and are tested on military bridging, horizontal and vertical construction and military demolitions, including mine detection. They also conduct several field training exercise where students lead combat engineering missions.

Once completed, most graduates are sent to engineer units where they will serve as platoon leaders and in various staff roles.

Notes
Under the old BOLC model, newly commissioned officers spent the first four weeks learning common military tasks and functions.  After the implementation of the BOLC program in the summer of 2006, this common core training is conducted at non-branch specific BOLC II. As of 2009, BOLC II, was phased out, and those core components are in the process of being reintegrated into BOLC (previously BOLC III and BOLC B).

See also
Engineer Branch (United States)
United States Army Corps of Engineers
Military engineer
911th Engineer Company (formerly the MDW Engineer Company)
Basic Officer Leaders Course

External links
 U.S. Army Engineer School
 EBOLC Website

United States Army Corps of Engineers
United States Army schools